There are three species of bird in two genera known as bushbirds :
Clytoctantes
 Recurve-billed bushbird, 	Clytoctantes alixii
 Rondônia bushbird, 	Clytoctantes atrogularis
Neoctantes
 Black bushbird, 	Neoctantes niger

Birds by common name